is a former Japanese racing driver, and the co-founder of TOM'S, a Japanese racing team and tuner for Toyota and Lexus.

His son, Shingo was also a racing driver.

Career

Racing career
Tachi was born in Suzuka, Japan. Kenji Mimura, the founder of Maki, has been his friend since their high school years. Originally, Tachi did not like automobiles because he would become carsick. But the influence of his friend led him to automobile racing.

Tachi began car racing in 1965 and became a factory-driver for Toyota from 1971.

In 1974, Tachi founded TOM'S with ex-Toyota dealer, Kiyoshi Oiwa. The name of "TOM'S" is an abbreviation of "Tachi", "Oiwa", and "MotorSports".

He continued his career as a racing driver until 1982. After retirement, he occasionally returned to race but has usually concentrated on management of his company.

Political career
On May 21, 2010, Your Party announced that Tachi would represent the party as a proportional candidate in the 2010 House of Councillors election.

References

External links
 What's TOM'S  - comment as the chairman of TOM'S. 
 

1947 births
Living people
Japanese racing drivers
Sportspeople from Mie Prefecture
Toyota people
Sports car racing team owners
TOM'S drivers
World Sportscar Championship drivers